Ab Dar or Abdar may refer to:
Abdar, East Azerbaijan, a village in Iran
Ab Dar, Lorestan, a village in Iran
Abdar, Hamadan, a village in Iran
Abdar, Kerman, a village in Iran
Abdar, Shahr-e Babak, a village in Iran

See also
 Dar Ab (disambiguation)